Arnold Berman (May 14, 1929–January 19, 1994) was an American politician who served one term in the Kansas State Senate from 1977 to 1980.

References

1929 births
1994 deaths
Democratic Party Kansas state senators
20th-century American politicians
Politicians from Lawrence, Kansas